Patrick Mullane VC (October 1858 – 20 November 1919) was a recipient of the Victoria Cross, the highest and most prestigious award for gallantry in the face of the enemy that can be awarded to British and Commonwealth forces. He later achieved the rank of regimental sergeant-major.

Early life
Mullane was born in Ahmednagar, Deccan, India, the son of Marguerite and Private Patrick Mullane, Royal Artillery.

Award details
He was about 21 years old, and a sergeant in the Royal Horse Artillery, British Army during the Second Anglo-Afghan War when the following deed took place during the battle of Maiwand for which he was awarded the VC:

Sothebys near sale of the medal 1904

The Sotheby's auction house in London were about to auction the medal that had previously been sold by Patrick Mullane's relatives.

See also
Irish Winners of the Victoria Cross (Richard Doherty & David Truesdale, 2000)
Monuments to Courage (David Harvey, 1999)
The Register of the Victoria Cross (This England, 1997)

References

External links
Location of grave and VC medal (E. London)

Irish recipients of the Victoria Cross
Royal Horse Artillery soldiers
1858 births
1919 deaths
19th-century Irish people
Irish soldiers in the British Army
Second Anglo-Afghan War recipients of the Victoria Cross
People from Ahmednagar
British Army recipients of the Victoria Cross
Military personnel of British India